Afri may refer to:

 Afri, a people in north Africa after which the continent of Africa may be named
 Afri (organisation), an Irish organisation that promotes human rights, peace and justice
 Afri-can, also known as a ramkie, a type of guitar
 Afri-Cola, a cola soft drink produced in Germany
 Afriski, the only skiing resort in Lesotho
 Wadsworth Jarrell and the AFRI-COBRA movement about the African Commune of Bad Relevant Artists

See also 
 Afer (disambiguation)
 Africa